In geometry, the paragyrate diminished rhombicosidodecahedron is one of the Johnson solids. It can be constructed as a rhombicosidodecahedron with one pentagonal cupola rotated through 36 degrees, and the opposing pentagonal cupola removed.

External links
 

Johnson solids